Jean-Marc Antersijn (born 5 January 1996) is an professional Aruban football goalkeeper who plays for the Curacao National Team and is currently without a club.

Club career
Following an internship with PEC Zwolle, Antersijn moved to Haaglandia to replace Jan Vermolen.

International

Antersijn won the Golden Glove Award for his superlative performances at the 2014 CFU U-20 Tournament. Aruba were awarded the Fair Play award as well.

Despite hoping to represent Aruba in the 2018 World Cup qualifiers, This goalkeeper only has one senior cap for his country,  a friendly against Guam.

In 2017, he signed for TEC.

Before the 2021 season, he signed for FC Arlanda. In 2021, Antersijn signed for Atlantic City FC.

References

External links
 
 

Living people
1996 births
Aruban footballers
Association football goalkeepers
Aruba international footballers
SV Dakota players
Aruban Division di Honor players
SV TEC players
Expatriate footballers in the Netherlands
Aruban expatriate footballers
IFK Eskilstuna players
Division 2 (Swedish football) players
Aruba under-20 international footballers
People from Noord
Aruban people of Curaçao descent